The Bloodhound Gang may refer to:

The Bloodhound Gang (TV series), a segment on the PBS television show 3-2-1 Contact
The Bloodhound Gang, an American alternative rock band founded in 1991 as a hip hop group and branched out into other genres, and took its name from the TV show segment

See also 
Bloodhound (disambiguation)